St. Nicholas Cathedral (Russian: Свято-Никольский Собор, tr. sviato nikolskii sobor) is a Russian Orthodox cathedral of the  in the city of Almaty, Kazakhstan.

Pre-revolutionary period 
On 13 February 1906, the executor of the technical projects of Verny and the head of the church construction works of the city and other places of Turkestan diocese, informed bishop , during a visit to Turkestan cathedral, that the question of the construction was resolved. On 14 December 1908 the new church in Verny, designed by architect S. K. Troparevsky, was consecrated in honor of Saint Nicholas. Father Alexander Skalsky was appointed rector of the church.

Architecturally, the building is a seven-domed,  with high vaults and belfry, with azure domes.

Soviet period 

Simultaneously with the arrest of Bishop  in February 1936, St. Nicholas Church was closed. Its premises were used as a museum of atheism.

On 5 July 1945, the post of bishop of Alma-Ata, which had been vacant since 1937, was replaced by a decision of the Holy Synod. On 8 December 1946 Bishop  consecrated the first renovated chapel in honor of Saint Barbara, and a week later, on 15 December the main chapel was consecrated, in honor of Saint Nicholas. St. Nicholas Church was made the cathedral of the diocese.

Kazakhstani period 
As per the decision of the akim of Almaty on 28 November 1995 № 63 "On inclusion in the state list of historical and cultural monuments of local importance of the Almaty St. Nicholas Cathedral" the building was included in the list of sites protected by the state.

The first Sunday School enrollment was organized in 1991. In 2010 the new Sunday School building was consecrated.

In 2012, a monument to St. Nicholas was placed in front of the cathedral.

References 

Cathedrals in Kazakhstan
Churches completed in 1908
1908 establishments in the Russian Empire
Buildings and structures in Almaty
Russian Orthodox cathedrals in Asia
Eastern Orthodox church buildings in Kazakhstan
Eclectic architecture